Simona Borioni (born 7 January 1971) is an Italian theater and movie actress.

Life and career 
Born in Rome, Borioni studied singing and theater and followed acting workshops held by, among others, Susan Strasberg and Giorgio Albertazzi. She began his acting career in 1992, being mainly active on television where she appeared in several TV-series including  Don Matteo, Carabinieri, Le ragazze di Piazza di Spagna, Camera Cafe and the Canale 5 soap opera Vivere. She also appeared in films, including works by Tinto Brass and Giuseppe Piccioni.

Selected filmography 
 Graffiante desiderio (1993)
 Senso '45 (2002)
 Le ultime 56 ore (2010)
 La bella società (2010)
 Una notte da paura (2011)
 Il camionista (2016)

TV
 Distretto di Polizia 3 (2002) –
 Vivere (2002–2003)
 Ho sposato un calciatore (2005)
 A voce alta (2006) –
 Questa è la mia terra (2006) –
 Due imbroglioni e... mezzo! (2007–2009)
 Dottor Clown (2008)
 Il mistero del lago (2009)
 Rex (2009)
 SMS - Squadra molto speciale (2010)
 Un amore e una vendetta (2011)
 Le tre rose di Eva 2 – serie TV (2013)
Un caso di coscienza 5 (2013)

References

External links 
 

1971 births
Living people
Actresses from Rome
Italian film actresses
Italian television actresses
Italian stage actresses